Grand Valley Provincial Park is a provincial park located in the Assiniboine River Valley in Manitoba, Canada, about  west of Brandon. It was designated as a Provincial Park in 1961.

The park is located in the Stockton eco-district within the Aspen Parkland eco-region. This eco-region is part of the Prairies eco-zone.

See also
List of protected areas of Manitoba
List of provincial parks in Manitoba

References

External links
Grand Valley Provincial Park, draft management plan

Provincial parks of Manitoba
Protected areas of Manitoba